John Thomas Cretney (1879 – 1956) was an English professional footballer who played as a wing half.

References

1879 births
1956 deaths
English footballers
Association football defenders
Burnley F.C. players
Newcastle United F.C. players
Gainsborough Trinity F.C. players
English Football League players
People from Harrington, Cumbria
Footballers from Cumbria